Microbisium parvulum is a species of pseudoscorpion in the family Neobisiidae.

References

Further reading

External links

 
 

Neobisiidae
Animals described in 1895